The 1979–80 Macedonian Republic League was the 36th since its establishment. FK Rabotnichki won their 10th and last championship title.

Participating teams

Final table

External links
SportSport.ba
Football Federation of Macedonia 

Macedonian Football League seasons
Yugo
3